Abdullah Khan Afshar was the third khan of the Zanjan Khanate from 1782 to 1797.

References

 Anvar Changhiz Oglu, Aydın Avşar, Avşarlar, Bakı, "Şuşa", 2008,

People from Zanjan, Iran
Zanjan Khanate
Ethnic Afshar people